Paranoia Airlines is the third major-label solo studio album by Italian rapper Fedez, released on 25 January 2019 through Sony Music Italy. It was preceded by the release of the single "Prima di ogni cosa". It became available to pre-order on 30 November 2018. Fedez will embark on a tour of major Italian cities in the promotion of the album from March to April 2019.

Background
Paranoia Airlines is Fedez's first solo album since 2014's Pop-Hoolista. 
The album was mainly produced by Michele Canova, except for three songs, produced by Takagi & Ketra.
Fedez stated that he would be leaving as a judge and mentor on The X Factor Italy to promote the album, saying he wants to dedicate himself to his own music.

Promotion
Fedez revealed the cover of the album on social media in November 2018. He later revealed a large billboard in his home city of Milan promoting the album and tour.

Track listing
Track listing adapted from iTunes and Tidal.

Charts

Weekly charts

Year-end charts

References

2019 albums
Fedez albums
Italian-language albums
Sony Music Italy albums